Stanisław Jaśkiewicz (12 January 1907, Liepāja, Russian Empire - 21 December 1980, Warsaw, Poland) was a Polish actor.

He graduated from the Warsaw Conservatory in 1929, making his theatrical debut at 21 November that year as Francis Flute in the Vilnius Municipal Theater production of A Midsummer Night's Dream. Along the years, he was part of the regular cast in the Warsaw Elizeum Theater (at 1931), the Lemberg Municipal Theater (from 1932 to 1938), the Pohulanka Theater in Warsaw (1938–41), the Łódź Soldiers' House Theater (1946–47), the Zygmunt Hübner Theater in Warsaw (1947-9), the Modernist Warsaw Theater (1949-1957) and the Polish Theatre (1957–75). In 1963 he was awarded the Officer's Cross of the Order of Polonia Restituta.

He first appeared on screen at the 1937 movie Flaming Heart (Płomienne serca), as the student-turned-soldier Wojtek. He played in more than thirty movies and television productions until his departure.

Filmography

References

External links
Stanisław Jaśkiewicz on the IMDb.

1907 births
1980 deaths
Actors from Liepāja
Polish male film actors
Polish male stage actors
Officers of the Order of Polonia Restituta
20th-century Polish male actors